Federico Gil (born 29 April 1988) is an Argentine sports shooter. He competed in the men's skeet event at the 2016 Summer Olympics. He finished in 27th place. He qualified to represent Argentina at the 2020 Summer Olympics.

His sister is fellow Olympian Melisa Gil.

References

External links
 

1988 births
Living people
Argentine male sport shooters
Olympic shooters of Argentina
Shooters at the 2016 Summer Olympics
Shooters at the 2015 Pan American Games
South American Games silver medalists for Argentina
South American Games medalists in shooting
Competitors at the 2014 South American Games
Pan American Games competitors for Argentina
Shooters at the 2020 Summer Olympics

Sportspeople from Buenos Aires